Byron Talbot (born 15 September 1964) is a former professional tennis player from South Africa. He enjoyed most of his tennis success while playing doubles. During his career, he won seven doubles titles and finished as a runner-up six times. He achieved a career-high doubles world ranking of number 20 in 1996.

Byron played collegiate tennis at the University of Tennessee. He is currently working as a financial advisor for Merrill Lynch in Dallas, Texas.

Career finals

Doubles (7 wins, 6 losses)

References

External links
 
 

South African male tennis players
Living people
1964 births
White South African people
Sportspeople from Johannesburg